Dracula A.D. 1972 is a 1972 British horror film, directed by Alan Gibson and produced by Hammer Film Productions. It was written by Don Houghton and stars Christopher Lee, Peter Cushing and Stephanie Beacham. Unlike earlier films in Hammer's Dracula series, Dracula A.D. 1972 had a contemporary setting in an attempt to update the Dracula story for modern audiences. Dracula is brought back to life in modern London and preys on a group of young partygoers that includes the descendant of his nemesis, Van Helsing.

It is the seventh Hammer film featuring Dracula, and the sixth to star Christopher Lee in the title role. It also marked the return of Peter Cushing as Van Helsing for the first time since The Brides of Dracula (1960), and was the first to feature both Lee and Cushing in their respective roles since Dracula (1958).

It was followed by the last film in Hammer's Dracula series to star Christopher Lee, The Satanic Rites of Dracula, which similarly utilized a modern setting and featured most of the same central characters.

Plot
In 1872, Count Dracula and his nemesis Lawrence Van Helsing battle on the top of a runaway coach. The carriage crashes and Dracula is partly impaled by one of the wheels. In the struggle, Van Helsing manages to fully push the wheel into the vampire's chest, staking him. This done, Van Helsing collapses and dies from his own wounds. At that moment, a follower of Dracula arrives, collects Dracula's remains and, a few days later, buries them near Van Helsing's grave at St Bartolph's Church.

A century later, Jessica Van Helsing, granddaughter of occult expert Lorrimer Van Helsing and descendant of Dracula's old nemesis, and Johnny Alucard who closely resembles Dracula's disciple from 1872, are among a group of young hippies. Alucard persuades Jessica and the others to attend a black magic ceremony in the now abandoned, deconsecrated St Bartolph's, where he performs a bloody ritual involving one of their group, Laura Bellows. Jessica and the others flee in horror, after which Dracula is resurrected and kills Laura. Laura's body is discovered, drained of blood, and a police investigation begins which is headed by Inspector Murray.

Murray suspects an occult element and interviews Lorrimer, who is shocked to learn the details of Laura’s death. He realises that Alucard (whose name is Dracula written backwards) is a disciple of Dracula, and that the Count must have returned. Meanwhile, Alucard brings another of Jessica’s friends, Gaynor Keating, to St. Bartolph's, where she is killed by Dracula and Alucard volunteers to become a vampire. The vampiric Alucard kills a passerby and lures Jessica’s boyfriend, Bob, to a café they frequent, where he turns him into a vampire as well. While Lorrimer is out, Bob goes to the Van Helsing house and persuades Jessica to come to the café, where he and Alucard capture her and take her to Dracula.

Aided by one of Jessica's friends, Lorrimer tracks Alucard to his flat and battles him. Alucard accidentally kills himself with the running water in the bathroom shower. At St Bartolph's, Lorrimer finds Bob's dead body, slain by sunlight before he could reach his resting place, and Jessica in a trance, with Dracula planning to take his revenge on the Van Helsing family by turning her into a vampire. Lorrimer sets a trap for Dracula by placing a pit of stakes underneath the graveyard and waits for him to return at nightfall. The two have a struggle in which Lorrimer attempts to kill Dracula with a silver knife, but the knife is pulled out by Jessica, still under Dracula’s command. As the pair go outside, Lorrimer throws holy water at Dracula, which burns his hands and causes him to fall into the pit of stakes. Realising Dracula is still barely alive, Lorrimer uses a shovel to push Dracula into the stakes even further. Dracula dies, his body crumbling into ashes, and his spell over Jessica is broken. As Jessica embraces her grandfather, the title "Rest in Final Peace" is shown.

Cast
 Peter Cushing as Lorrimer Van Helsing / Lawrence Van Helsing
 Christopher Lee as Count Dracula
 Stephanie Beacham as Jessica Van Helsing
 Christopher Neame as Johnny Alucard / follower of Dracula (1872)
 Marsha Hunt as Gaynor Keating
 Caroline Munro as Laura Bellows
 Janet Key as Anna Bryant
 Michael Kitchen as Greg
 Lally Bowers as Matron Party Hostess
 Flanagan as Go Go Dancer (uncredited)
 Stoneground as Themselves
 Michael Coles as Inspector Murray
 William Ellis as Joe Mitcham
 Philip Miller as Bob
 David Andrews as Detective Sergeant
 Constance Luttrell as Mrs. Donnelly
 Michael Daly as Charles
 Artro Morris as Police Surgeon
 Jo Richardson as Crying Matron
 Brian John Smith as Hippy Boy
 Penny Brahms as Hippy Girl

Production
Following the success of the modern-day vampire film Count Yorga, Vampire, Warner Bros commissioned two Hammer Dracula films set in the present day, which were to become Dracula A.D. 1972 and The Satanic Rites of Dracula. The film was inspired by the events surrounding the Highgate Vampire case.

For the Black Mass segment, the film used the track "Black Mass: An Electric Storm in Hell" by the pioneering electronic group White Noise, from their 1969 album An Electric Storm; Neame's dialogue was later sampled by Orbital for "Satan Live" and "Tension".

Filming
Dracula A.D. 1972 began production in September 1971 as Dracula Today and was filmed in Chelsea and Hertfordshire.

Soundtrack
The soundtrack was composed by former Manfred Mann member Mike Vickers, and is in a funky, "blaxploitation" style that reflects the early 1970s setting of the film. It was first released commercially in 2009 on CD. The film also featured two songs, "Alligator Man" and "You Better Come Through for Me", by the American band Stoneground (a late replacement for the Faces), which were included as bonus tracks on the CD.

 BSX Records (BSXCD 8855)
 Release date: 4 May 2009
 Limited edition of 1,500 copies

Track listing
 "Warner Bros. Logo (Theme from Dracula)"  – 0:09
 "Prologue/Hyde Park 1872" – 4:28
 "Main Theme: Dracula A.D. 1972" – 2:04
"Johnny Looks at Ring/Legend of Dracula" – 1:01
 "Devil's Circle Music"  – 3:52
 "Baptism by Blood" – 5:18
 "Dracula Rising/The Blood Ritual/Laura Screams" – 2:37
 "Dracula Returns/Dracula Bites Laura" – 2:55
 "Alucard = Dracula/Not the One!/Give Me the Power!" – 4:15
 "Dumping the Body/Van Helsing Prepares/Jessica Walks Into the Trap" – 2:09
 "Van Helsing Heads to the Club" – 1:35
 "Van Helsing Confronts Johnny/Johnny's Ignoble Death Scene" – 3:56
 "Johnny Be Really Dead!/Van Helsing at the Church/Van Helsing Confronts Dracula/Rest in Final Peace/Main Theme: Dracula A.D. 1972 (Reprise)" – 11:50
Bonus tracks 
<li>"You Better Come Through for Me" – 3:29
Composed by Tim Barnes (ASCAP), performed by Stoneground  
<li>"Alligator Man" – 3:29
Written by Sal Valentino (BMI), performed by Stoneground

 Total duration: 53:07

Continuity
The film's opening sequence was not in the previous film, Scars of Dracula (1970), but is completely new and sets up a new short series of the Hammer Horror Dracula chronology finishing in the following film, The Satanic Rites of Dracula (1973). This film's prologue takes place in 1872 and therefore is impossible to reconcile with the previous films in the series, the chronology of which starts in 1885 as described in the 1958 original.

While the two present-day Dracula films star both Lee and Cushing, they do not correspond to the chronology established in the Victorian/Edwardian-era films; the first Hammer Dracula film, Dracula, is set in the 1880s, whereas the flashback sequence of the last battle between Van Helsing and Dracula in Dracula A.D. 1972 is set in 1872—long before the first meeting of Van Helsing and Dracula in the original film.

Release
Dracula A.D. 1972 was marketed with the taglines "Past, present or future, never count out the Count!" and "Welcome back, Drac!". When it was released in the United States, a brief clip was played before the film in which actor Barry Atwater (the vampire Janos Skorzeny in The Night Stalker) rises from a coffin and swears the entire audience in as members of the Count Dracula Society.

Reception
Critical reaction to Dracula A.D. 1972 has been mixed to negative. Upon the film's release, Roger Ebert gave the film only 1 star out of 4, while Clyde Jeavons of The Monthly Film Bulletin called it "an abortive and totally unimaginative attempt to update the Bram Stoker legend to present-day Chelsea," adding that "the attempt to reconcile Transylvania with S.W.3 merely sends the script haywire ('Close the devil's circle—dig the music, kids!') ... even that old stand-by, unintentional humour, has been torpedoed by an arch script which insultingly begs for laughs with lines like, 'She's a bit drained,' and 'Come in for a bite.'"

Dennis Prince of DVD Verdict said, "Dracula A.D. 1972 is definitely one of the weakest installments in Hammer's horror catalog and will likely only have strong appeal to Dracula completists." Eccentric Cinema wrote, "One can have a fun time with this movie—mostly because of its faults. It's cheese all right, professionally made cheese that's much better acted and staged than it really has any right to be."

The Science Fiction, Horror and Fantasy Film Review called the film "a major disappointment" and "the low-point of the whole Hammer Dracula series" despite "minor positive aspects". George R. Reis of DVD Drive-In wrote, "Considered a low point in Hammer's roster, Dracula A.D. 1972 is hardly that. ... [T]he film has a number of things going for it. ... Cushing's exceptional Van Helsing pretty much carries the film. ... Christopher Neame is charismatically evil as Johnny Alucard [and] his stirring fight scene with Van Helsing is a highlight. ... How can Hammer fans not like this stuff?"

In his 2017 book on vampire films of the 1970s, author Gary A. Smith wrote that looking back on the film, "what seemed like a terrible idea back in 1972, really isn't so dire after all. Now, so far removed from its contemporary setting, the swinging London of Dracula A.D. 1972 seems as much a period piece as the Victorian settings of its predecessors. The main problem with the film is that Dracula is confined to the ruins of a Gothic church and never really interacts with the modern world."

The film, despite its generally mixed reception, has some prominent admirers and supporters. American film director Tim Burton at one point claimed it to be among his favorite films, and English author, film critic and horror expert Kim Newman chose it as one of his top 10 favorite vampire movies. In the 2020 BBC/Netflix Dracula miniseries, the third episode is in itself an homage to the film, taking place in present day. It also includes references to it along with many other Hammer Dracula films.

Home media
The film was released on Blu-ray in 2018 by the Warner Archive Collection.

The film was released on DVD in 2005 by Warner Home Video in the United Kingdom, United States and Germany. It was released as Dracula A.D. 1972 in the UK and US and as Dracula jagt Mini-Mädchen in Germany.

On 6 November 2007, the movie was released in a set along with Dracula, Dracula Has Risen from the Grave, and Taste the Blood of Dracula.

See also
 Vampire film

References

Bibliography

External links

 
 
 
 
 Featurette for Dracula A.D. 1972 at the Internet Archive, includes behind the scenes footage and an interview with Christopher Lee

1972 films
1972 horror films
British horror films
Columbia Pictures films
Dracula films
1970s English-language films
Films directed by Alan Gibson
Films set in 1872
Films set in 1972
Films set in London
Films shot at EMI-Elstree Studios
Hammer Film Productions horror films
Films about Satanism
Warner Bros. films
Dracula (Hammer film series)
Resurrection in film
Films produced by Josephine Douglas
1970s British films